Costapex sulcatus is a species of sea snail, a marine gastropod mollusk, in the family Costellariidae, the ribbed miters.

Distribution
This species occurs in the following locations:
 Philippines
 Solomon Islands
 Vanuatu (Nation)

References

Costellariidae